The Battle of the Yellow Sea was a major naval battle of the Russo-Japanese War, fought on 10 August 1904. In the Russian Navy, it was referred to as the Battle of 10 August. The battle foiled an attempt by the Russian fleet at Port Arthur to break out and form up with the Vladivostok squadron, forcing them to return to port. Four days later, the Battle off Ulsan similarly ended the Vladivostok group's sortie, forcing both fleets to remain at anchor.

Background
The Imperial Russian Navy's First Pacific Squadron, commanded by Admiral Wilgelm Vitgeft, had been trapped in Port Arthur since the Imperial Japanese Navy's blockade began on 8 February 1904 with the Battle of Port Arthur. Throughout late July and early August, as the Imperial Japanese Army laid siege to Port Arthur, relations between Admiral Vitgeft and Russian Viceroy Yevgeni Alekseyev increasingly soured. Viceroy Alekseyev, a former admiral, favored an aggressive sortie so as to enable the First Pacific Squadron to link up with the Vladivostok Squadron and thereby create a naval force powerful enough to challenge the Japanese fleet. Admiral Vitgeft believed in a fleet in being, which simply stayed at anchor, while at the same time contributing some of his weaponry to the land battle as the safest course to follow. Although passive, Vitgeft's preference was actually more in keeping with the Russian Navy's doctrine, which was building up strength (waiting for the arrival of the Baltic Fleet, also known as the 2nd Pacific Squadron), and then engaging the Japanese navy in decisive battle.

Alekseyev appealed to St. Petersburg, and Tsar Nicholas II replied that he fully shared the Viceroy's opinion. Faced with an Imperial writ and threat of legal action, Admiral Vitgeft was ordered to sail for Vladivostok immediately. By 06:15 hours, on 10 August, Admiral Vitgeft, flying his flag in the battleship , began leading his battleships from the harbor.

Battle

Opening moves
At 09:55 his fleet had cleared the harbor's entrance, and as Admiral Vitgeft's Pacific Squadron completed their exit, he made a feint to the south-west to conceal his actual intent, whereby he succeeded in delaying Admiral Tōgō Heihachirō's concentration of his forces. Although Vitgeft's move had bought him time, Tōgō had nonetheless previously issued orders for his warships to assemble near Encounter Rock, in the event Admiral Vitgeft was to take that route. By 11:00 hours, it was clear in which direction Vitgeft's fleet was sailing: they were headed for the open sea.

Just after 13:00, Tōgō attempted to cross Vitgeft's T and commenced firing his main batteries from the extreme range of more than 8 miles. Vitgeft, with the battleship Retvizan, returned fire, but the range was excessive for both sides and no hits were scored. Tōgō had miscalculated his speed when trying to cross the enemy's T, and Vitgeft simply made a quick turn to port, maintained his speed, and increased his range from Tōgō's fleet. Within minutes, Admiral Vitgeft was again headed for the open sea, and Admiral Tōgō's pincer move had failed, as Admiral Dewa's cruisers had to turn quickly to avoid Tōgō's battleline, and thus broke contact without having fired a shot. As Tōgō observed Vitgeft's battleline swiftly move past his own in opposite directions, he quickly ordered each warship to turn about individually, which put his cruisers into the lead, but now parallel with Vitgeft's battleline.

By about 13:30 the Russian flagship had returned fire, knocking out Tōgō's wireless communications with two  shell direct hits at this extreme range. As the fleets continued to pound each other with all available guns, Tōgō's flagship was beginning to feel its wounds, and he tried to turn his vessel a bit, due to the hits she was taking (she ended up being hit 20 times), and urgently tried to have his cruisers engage the Russian battleline. But with his radio shot out, he had to rely on flag signals and radio relays from accompanying warships.

Stern chases
The Japanese cruisers had re-established contact with the Russian battleline, but were quickly driven off by their 305 mm gunfire. Both battlefleets were maintaining about 14 knots, but again, Vitgeft had managed to get past Tōgō, and the Japanese were forced to commence a stern chase. Mikasa and Asahi soon began to pound Poltava, scoring several hits. However, Admiral Ukhtomsky in the battleship Peresvet observed the plight of Poltava and ordered his division to fall back and help Poltava, and they began concentrating their gunfire onto Mikasa and Asahi. With Admiral Ukhtomsky's division firing, coupled with Poltavas rejoining of the fight, Mikasa and Asahi began taking too many hits, and upon the urging of his chief of staff, Tōgō used his superior speed to break contact, race ahead of Vitgeft's fleet, and try to re-establish contact again under more favorable conditions. By 15:20 the range was opened and the firing ceased.

As the battleships had broken contact, Admiral Dewa with his cruisers attempted to get into action, when suddenly the Russian battleships opened up on him. At about 15:40 one 305 mm shell hit Dewa's cruiser,  from a range of over 8 miles, which was well out of range of his  guns. Admiral Dewa decided against having his four Japanese cruisers engage with any Russian battleships.

By this time, only Tōgō's 6 warships (4 battleships and 2 armored cruisers) were chasing Vitgeft's 10 warships (6 battleships and 4 cruisers). With darkness only 3 hours away, Admiral Vitgeft believed that he had outranged Admiral Tōgō, and would lose him totally when darkness came. Tōgō knew this too, and ordered a  speed to catch up to the tail end of Vitgeft's fleet. By 17:35 hours Tōgō's warships had closed to within 3.5 miles of the again lagging battleship Poltava, and opened fire upon her. Admiral Dewa also showed up with his cruisers, and Tōgō ordered all battleships and cruisers to shell Poltava, hoping to at least sink one Russian battleship. However, the Russian commander, Captain Ivan P. Uspenskiy of Poltava and his crewmen scored several hits on Admiral Tōgō's flagship. At this time, the Shimose shells loaded inside the 305 mm guns began detonating prematurely inside the hot gun barrels; knocking out of action one 305 mm on Shikishima at 17:45, and two 305 mm barrels on Asahi at 18:10 hours. By 18:30, Tōgō had only 11 of his original 16 305 mm guns still in action.

Hand-off
Although the range had dropped to about 3 miles, the secondary batteries of 155 and 203 mm guns were still ineffective, and Poltava and Peresvet, although heavily damaged, were still with the Russian battleline. By 18:30, Tōgō was still having trouble controlling his battleship's gunfire; Shikishima and Asahi were blasting away at the crippled Poltava, Fuji was shooting at Pobeda and Peresvet, while the flagship Mikasa was duelling with the Russian flagship Tsesarevich. No IJN warships were shooting at the Russian battleships Retvizan and Sevastopol, which allowed them to freely blast away at Mikasa. With darkness only 30 minutes away, the Japanese flagship Mikasa almost no longer combat effective, and Russian gunfire seemingly becoming more accurate and effective with each cannon shot; the flagship signaled to Asahi to take over (known as a battle handoff) the shooting upon the lead Russian battleship. Within 10 minutes of being relieved by Asahi, Admiral Tōgō fired a 305 mm salvo into the Russian flagship Tsesarevich, instantly killing Admiral Vitgeft and his immediate staff, and jamming the flagship's steering wheel. The explosion had wedged the wheel into a port turn, sharp enough so that Tsesarevich heeled over 12 degrees. Retvizan, which was unaware of the situation on the flagship, followed in her wake. By the time Pobeda arrived at the turning point, Tsesarevich had swung around 180 degrees and was heading back into her own line. With no signal to indicate what had happened, the other ships were unaware that Tsesarevich was not only out of control and without its admiral, but was actually without anyone at all in command.

Charge of Retvizan

Prince Pavel Ukhtomsky of the battleship Peresvet soon realized that the flagship was out of action, and attempted to gain control of the Russian squadron. But a Japanese shell, falling wide, cut the foremast of Peresvet, preventing the signal flags from being hoisted as usual; they had to be hoisted along the bridge instead. Being thus almost hidden from view, the signal apparently was only seen on Sevastopol; no other Russian capital ships followed Ukhtomsky's lead.

At the same time Captain Eduard Schensnovich commanding Retvizan, immediately turned his battleship towards Tōgō's battleline, charging directly into it with all weapons firing, despite being down by the bow from battle damage. Tōgō's battleline shifted their fire onto Retvizan as the range dropped to less than three miles. There were so many shell splashes surrounding the charging battleship, that Japanese gunners were unable to adjust their fire. However, as Tōgō's battleships were running low on 305 mm shells, and many of his main guns were out of action, he decided to play it safe, and with the Russian squadron scattered, he turned the fight over to his cruisers and destroyers.

As Tōgō's ships began their turn, they fired a final salvo, hitting the enemy battleship with several shells, one of which seriously wounded Captain Schensnovich in the stomach. Retvizan laid smoke and also began to turn away, but the battleship had effectively ended the duel between the opposing pre-dreadnoughts, and had saved the flagship from destruction. There was little choice but to give up the attempt to reach Vladivostok and to return to Port Arthur. Even this proved impossible to coordinate, and many ships wandered off on their own.

Two hours later, the bulk of the Russian fleet returned to the relative safety of Port Arthur. Five battleships, a cruiser and ten destroyers made it back. The damaged Tsesarevich and three escorting destroyers sailed to Kiaochou, where they were interned by German authorities. The cruiser Askold and another destroyer sailed to Shanghai and were likewise interned by Chinese authorities. The cruiser Diana escaped to Saigon, where it was interned by the French. Only the small cruiser Novik sailed east around the Japanese home islands to try to reach Vladivostok. However, on 20 August pursuing Japanese cruisers forced the ship aground at Sakhalin, where it was destroyed by the crew after engaging the Japanese at the Battle of Korsakov.

Analysis
The Battle of the Yellow Sea was naval history's first major confrontation between modern steel battleship fleets, so with the exception of Admiral Tōgō's 20-minute duel with Russian Admiral Stark's battleships at Port Arthur on 9 February 1904, both Vitgeft and Tōgō were new to fighting modern steel battleship fleet actions.

Although Admiral Oskar Starck had been replaced by Admiral Stepan Makarov shortly after the Port Arthur battle, Makarov in turn was replaced by Vitgeft, following Makarov's death in April 1904, when his battleship  blew up and sank in the Yellow Sea, after striking mines. Had Admiral Starck remained in command at the time of the Yellow Sea battle, Admirals Tōgō and Starck would have met on equal terms, both retaining about equal combat experience in battleship fleet actions. But the naval force that Tōgō was to meet at Tsushima the following year was not the same type of battle fleet that he engaged at the Yellow Sea either. Though Admiral Vitgeft was new, many of his men were not, most of them were veterans of Far East duty, with some of them veterans of the 1900 Boxer Rebellion in China; thus they were a highly experienced fighting force.

Rangefinders and gunnery
During the late 1890s, it was thought that around 3 to 4 miles would be the norm for battleship engagements. Although 305 mm/40 caliber guns were quite capable of reaching out to the ranges that the Yellow Sea battle had opened up with (8 miles), the lack of effective range-finders and gun sights forced practical 305 mm (12 inch) gunfire to be held within a 3 to 4 mile range. Notwithstanding all of the above, the naval world was quite surprised after the opponents opened fire upon one another and scored hits while still over 8 miles apart.

The Yellow Sea engagement lasted some 6 to 7 hours, with about 4 of those hours being direct combat. During those nearly four hours of fighting, roughly 7,382 rounds were expended by both sides, ranging in size from 155 to 305 mm shells. Of those 7,382 shells fired, approximately 5,956 had been from 155 mm guns; 3,592 from the Imperial Japanese Navy, and 2,364 from the Imperial Russian Navy. 307 203 mm shells had been fired by the IJN, and none by the Russian fleet. Admiral Vitgeft's fleet had expended 224 254 mm shells compared to Tōgō's 33 shells. The long range gunnery duel that had commenced at a range of over 8 miles, and which began with 305 mm main gun fire, ended with 305 mm gun fire in near darkness, during which time 862 305 mm main gun rounds were fired; 259 from the Russian battleships, and 603 from the Japanese battleships.

Battle damage and casualties
The nearly seven hours of naval combat coupled with the estimated 7,382 fired shells had produced a hit rate of 1.7%. 

Captain Eduard Schensnovich, who had charged his battleship into Admiral Tōgō's battleline, thus ending the battleship fleet duel and saving the Russian flagship from destruction, later died from his wounds received in April 1910, at the age of 58.

Damage and casualties included the following:

Result
The Russians wanted to break out and sail to Vladivostok (relocating the fleet to there would have left the Japanese needing to mount a new campaign if it wanted to besiege the Russian fleet again and such a campaign would have overtaxed the resources of Field Marshal Ōyama).  The Japanese fleet contained the last of their battleships, and they had an underlying objective to destroy the Russian fleet while minimising their own losses.  Once the Russian fleet left Port Arthur the Japanese initially sought to prevent it returning there.  When the Japanese realised the Russians were not returning to Port Arthur they also sought to prevent the Russians reaching an alternative port.  The Japanese prevented the Russians from reaching Vladivostok but failed to stop most of the fleet returning to Port Arthur.  Neither side achieved its tactical goals. The Japanese, however, were successful in preventing the breakout, and the returning Russian ships were stripped of their guns in order to reinforce the shore batteries. They were later eliminated in the course of the Siege of Port Arthur, leaving the Japanese with undisputed naval control of the area.

Notes

References
Corbett, Sir Julian. Maritime Operations In The Russo-Japanese War 1904–1905 (1994) Annapolis, Maryland: Naval Institute Press. 
 
 Friedman, Norman. (2013) Naval Firepower: Battleship Guns and Gunnery in the Dreadnaught Era. Seaforth Publishing; 

 
 Nish, Ian (1985). The Origins of the Russo-Japanese War. Longman. 
 Sedwick, F. R. (1909). The Russo-Japanese War. The Macmillan Company
 Semenov, Vladimir, Capt. The Battle of Tsushima (1912). New York, E. P. Dutton. 
 Semenoff, Vladimir, Capt. The Battle of Tsushima (1907). London, John Murray, Albemarle Street, W.
 Steer, A. P., Lieutenant; Imperial Russian Navy. (1913) The "Novik" and the Part she Played in the Russo-Japanese War, 1904. Translated by L.A.B., translator and editor of "Rasplata". New York, E.P. Dutton.

External links
 Russo-Japanese War Research Society 
 Russian Navy history of war: Паровой броненосный и миноносный флот
 article in Russian Language: Энциклопедия кораблей/Сражения/Русско-японская война/Желтое море

Conflicts in 1904
1904 in Japan
Naval battles of the Russo-Japanese War
Yellow Sea
Battles involving Japan
Battles involving Russia
August 1904 events